José Valentín Caeiro Igós (14 February 1925 – 14 January 1981) was a Spanish retired footballer who played as a forward, and a former manager.

Playing career
Caeiro was born in Hondarribia, Gipuzkoa, Basque Country. His first professional club was Segunda División's Racing de Ferrol, where he joined in 1945.

In 1948 Caeiro moved to fellow league team Real Sociedad, and scored an impressive 26 goals in 38 matches during his first season, which ended in promotion to La Liga. In the 1950–51 campaign he contributed with 17 goals in only 24 matches; this prompted a move to Valencia CF also in the top tier.

After being rarely used by the Valencians, Caeiro signed for neighbouring Hércules CF in 1953. After being again essential (16 goals in 24 outings), he moved abroad and signed for Stade Rennais FC.

Caeiro contributed to Rennes' top flight promotion in 1956 with 17 goals, but appeared sparingly during the following season. In 1958 he returned to Racing Ferrol after a short spell at AS Brestoise, and retired in the following year, aged 33.

Managerial career
Caeiro was in charge of Racing de Ferrol for two full campaigns, both in the second level. He was subsequently appointed manager of Pontevedra CF, but left the club after suffering relegation.

Caeiro was subsequently in charge of Real Jaén, SD Ponferradina and Arosa SC.

Death
On 14 January 1981, Caeiro died after suffering a heart attack, aged 55. He was still in charge of Arosa during that time.

Honours
Real Sociedad
Segunda División: 1948–49

Rennes
Ligue 2: 1955–56

References

External links

Stats and bio at CiberChe 
Aúpa Deportiva profile 

1925 births
1981 deaths
People from Hondarribia
Spanish footballers
Footballers from the Basque Country (autonomous community)
Association football forwards
La Liga players
Segunda División players
Racing de Ferrol footballers
Real Sociedad footballers
Valencia CF players
Hércules CF players
Ligue 1 players
Ligue 2 players
Stade Rennais F.C. players
Spanish expatriate footballers
Spanish expatriate sportspeople in France
Expatriate footballers in France
Spanish football managers
Segunda División managers
Tercera División managers
Racing de Ferrol managers
Real Jaén managers
Pontevedra CF managers
SD Ponferradina managers